Madhyapur Youth Association is a Nepali association football club based in Thimi, Bhaktapur. They play in the Martyr's Memorial B-Division League. It was founded in 2064 B.S. by former national goalkeeper Upendra Man Singh. In 2012, MYA became the first club from Bhaktapur to reach the Martyr's Memorial A-Division League but got relegated in the same season.

History
In 2008, former national team captain Upendra Man Singh with a few other people having football background established a social club. It did social work and also gave the youths football training to local youths to keep them from bad habits. Football For Education is the club's motto.
The team gained promotion from the 2010 Martyr's Memorial C-Division League and again from the 2011 Martyr's Memorial B-Division League. They reached the semi-finals of the inaugural Ncell Cup knockout tournament losing 2–0 to Ranipokhari Corner Team. They failed to maintain that form in the 2012-13 Martyr's Memorial A-Division League and got relegated by just one point.

Fans
MYA has a large fan base particularly in the Bhaktapur district. They have possibly the biggest fan following in Nepal. They had the highest numbers of fans attending the games in the 2012-13 Martyr's Memorial A-Division League.

MYA had got into trouble with the ANFA after the fans started throwing the seats off the Dasarath Rangasala Stadium after they got relegated blaming the referee was biased.

Colours
The colours of the jersey (red and black) is designed to match the Haku Patasi, a traditional dress worn by the Newari women in the Bhaktapur area.

Team

Honours

National 

 B-Division National League
 Champions: 2012
 Martyr's Memorial C-Division League
 Runners-up: 2008–09

References

Bhaktapur
Football clubs in Nepal
2008 establishments in Nepal